Après is the sixteenth studio album by American rock singer Iggy Pop.

Background
Consisting partly of covers sung in French, it was released on 9 May 2012 on Thousand Mile Inc after the album was rejected by Virgin EMI Records. Pop said his record company would have 'preferred that I do a rock album with popular punks' and that "They didn't think they would make any money, they didn't think my fans would like it - very sensible attitudes for a sensible sort of person - but that's a different sort of person than I am."

The album has been described as containing ″crooning vocals, Cole Porter covers, soft melodies, and an all-around sense of everything suave″.

When asked by Bill Flanagan if he had heard any good records lately, Bob Dylan mentioned Après.

The cover photo is referring to the figure La Conscience played by Iggy Pop in the French movie L'Étoile du jour (Morning Star) by Sophie Blondy.

Track listing

Personnel
Adapted from Discogs.
Iggy Pop – vocals
Hal Cragin – guitar (tracks 1–9), bass guitar, piano (tracks 3–5, 7, 8), vocals (track 9)
Steven Ulrich – electric guitar (tracks 1, 2)
Danny Blume – acoustic guitar (tracks 1, 2), electric guitar (track 9)
Jerry Zaslavsky – organ (tracks 1, 2)
Jon Cowherd – piano (track 10)
Ben Perowsky (tracks 5, 9), Jerry Marotta (tracks 4, 7), Kevin Hupp (tracks 1–3) – drums, percussion
Jainardo Batista – percussion (tracks 1, 2)
Aaron Halva – tres guitar (tracks 1, 2)
Lucie Aimé (tracks 1, 5), Sarah Fimm (tracks 1, 2, 9) – backing vocals
Tim Ouimette – horn arrangements (tracks 5, 8), horns (track 5), trombone (track 8)
Lulu Gainsbourg – horn arrangement (track 2)
Technical
Hal Cragin – producer, engineer, mixing
Andy Tommasi – additional production, engineer
Guillaume le Grontec, Sophie Blondy – photography

Charts

References

External links 

 

Iggy Pop albums
2012 albums
Covers albums